Gillette is a surname. Notable people with the surname include:

 Anita Gillette (born 1936), American actress and game-show panelist
 Arthur Gillette (1869–1921), American pediatric orthopedic surgeon
 Chester Gillette (1883–1908), American murderer
 Clarence Preston Gillette (1859–1941), American entomologist
 Douglas W. Gillette (1918–1942), American naval officer
 Elizabeth V. Gillette (1874–1965), New York physician, assemblywoman 1920
 Frank Gillette (born 1941), American video and installation artist
 Frank E. Gillette (born 1848), American politician and judge, Associate Justice of the Oklahoma Territory Supreme Court (1902-1907)
 Guy Gillette (1879–1973), American politician from Iowa
 Jim Gillette (born 1967), American singer
 King C. Gillette (1855–1932), American businessman and founder of the Gillette Safety Razor Company
 Lee Gillette (1912–1981), American record producer and A&R director
 Mic Gillette (1951–2016), American brass player, member of the R&B band Tower of Power
 Paul Gillette (1938–1996), author and wine expert
 Sandra Gillette (born 1974), American singer and rapper known as Gillette (singer)
 William Gillette (1853–1937), American actor famous for his stage version of Sherlock Holmes

See also
Gillette (disambiguation)
Gillett (surname)